Mokdong Hyperion (Korean: 목동 하이페리온) is a group of three buildings located in the Mok-dong, Yangcheon-gu district of Seoul, South Korea, completed in 2003. The towers are used as residential housing. Tower A is the world's 48th tallest residential building. Below the building is the Hyundai Department store, a chain of high end department stores in South Korea. At the time of its completion, the building was the tallest in the country but was surpassed by Samsung Tower Palace 3 – Tower G in 2004. Main Usage (residential)

See also
Samsung Tower Palace 3 – Tower G
63 Building
Korean architecture

Structure
The Hyperion Tower floors B1~B2 and 1~7 are a department store, while B3~B6 is a parking lot, and floors 9~65 are residential.

External links
SkyscraperPage.com

Buildings and structures in Yangcheon District
Skyscrapers in Seoul
Residential buildings completed in 2003
Residential skyscrapers in South Korea
2003 establishments in South Korea